Stoneham Mountain Resort is a ski resort, located north of Quebec City, Quebec, Canada, in the municipality of Stoneham-et-Tewkesbury. There are 41 trails covering  over four mountains. Nineteen trails are available for night skiing, consisting in the largest network of night skiing in Canada. The resort is owned by Resorts of the Canadian Rockies. In 2017, the Poma double ski lift and Doppelmayr T-Bar were removed. A new ski lift was built to replace them, a Doppelmayr 4-CLF fixed-grip lift with loading conveyor. This is 4,700 feet long with a ride time of 8.5 minutes. It has a maximum capacity of 1900 persons per hour.

Notable events
Since 2007, Stoneham Mountain resort has been the host of the Snowboard FIS World Cup Finals, held yearly in March. In January 2013, Stoneham hosted the FIS Snowboarding World Championships. In 1993, the mountain hosted a slalom event of the alpine skiing World Cup, won by one of the most dominant alpine ski racers in history, Alberto Tomba of Italy.

See also
 Mont-Sainte-Anne
 Le Massif
 List of ski areas and resorts in Canada

References

External links
	

 Official website of Stoneham Mountain Resort
 Official website of the Snow Jamboree (FIS Snowboard World Cup Finals)
 360° panorama of the Mountain at night

Ski areas and resorts in Quebec
Geography of Capitale-Nationale
Tourist attractions in Capitale-Nationale